Region 9 or Region IX can refer to:

Former Region 9 (Johannesburg), an administrative district in the city of Johannesburg, South Africa, from 2000 to 2006
Araucanía Region, Chile
Zamboanga Peninsula Region, Philippines

Region name disambiguation pages